Dark Back of Time is a 1998 book by the Spanish writer Javier Marías. Ester Allen's English translation was published by New Directions in 2001. The book is a meditation on the sources of, and reactions to the author's 1992 novel, All Souls.

External links
"Stranger Than Fiction," by Wendy Lesser, The New York Times, May 6, 2001.
"Getting a grip on the past," by Martin Beagles, Times Literary Supplement, April 18, 2003. 
"Dark Back of Time" at Complete Review. Includes links to many reviews.

1998 non-fiction books
Works by Javier Marías
Spanish non-fiction literature
Alfaguara books